Clifton O. Dummett, Sr. (1919–2011) was a noted American dentist, dental professor and dean, and dental historian.

Early life and education 
Dummett was born in Georgetown on May 20, 1919 in what was then British Guiana. He studied at Howard University and Roosevelt University, then earned his Doctor of Dental Surgery from Northwestern University in 1941. He later earned a master's degree in periodontics from Northwestern University and a master's of public health from the University of Michigan.

Career 
He became dean a faculty member of the Meharry Medical College school of dentistry in Nashville, Tennessee in 1947. He was made dean of the dental school in 1949, becoming the youngest dean in the United States at age 28. In 1955 he enlisted in the United States Air Force. In 1966 he joined the faculty of the University of Southern California.

References 

American dentists
African-American dentists
1919 births
2011 deaths
20th-century dentists
20th-century African-American people
21st-century African-American people
Guyanese emigrants to the United States
Roosevelt University alumni
Harvard University alumni
Meharry Medical College
Northwestern University alumni
University of Michigan alumni
University of Southern California faculty
Members of the National Academy of Medicine